Underground Voices is an independent American book publisher. Originally started as an online literary magazine in 2004, it expanded into a small press in 2009. In 2013, it became an independent book publisher. Underground Voices is based in Los Angeles.

Awards and recognitions
Work published has been awarded or received honorable mention in the following:
2016 Finalist, 19th Library of Virginia Literary award
2015 Finalist, Beverly Hills Literary Award
2014 Notable Indie Book, Shelf Unbound
2014 Finalist, International Book Awards
Dzanc Books 2008 Best of the Web 
 2007 Pushcart Prize XXXI Best of the Small Presses Anthology - Special Mention
 storySouth Million Writer's Award 2004, 2005, 2007, 2008, 2009

Select books by Underground Voices
Petroleum Transfer Engineer by Richard Klin (2018; paperback 978-0998892337)
The Good Dead by Al Sim (2017; paperback 978-0998892313)
Super Sport by Ralph Bland (2017; paperback 978-0998892306)
The Pull of It by Wendy J. Fox (2016; paperback 978-0990433170)
Miraculous Fauna by Timmy Reed (2016; paperback 978-0990433156)
The Beginning Things by Bunny Goodjohn (2015; paperback 978-0990433163)
West by Whitney Poole (2015; paperback 978-0990433132)
The Demon who Peddled Longing by Khanh Ha (2014; paperback 978-0990433118)
Faulkner & Friends by Vicki Salloum (2014; paperback 978-0990433101)
Scars of the New Order by Scott Neuffer (2014; paperback 9780983045687)
The Collector of Tears by Michael C. Keith (2014; paperback 978-0983045670)
Scarred Canvas by RC Edrington (2013; paperback 978-0983045649)
From the UV Files (2012; paperback 978-0983045632) 
Hotel Oblivion (2011; paperback 978-0983045625)
Last Train To Noir City (2010; paperback 978-0-9830456-0-1)
Chewing The Fat (2009; paperback 978-0615314754)

Select shorts from Underground Voices e-book series
Inferno by Jim Meirose (2017)
Five Words That Can Cripple a Man by Max Mundan (2016)
The Top Floor by Vince Reighard (2015)
Hard to Learn. A novella by J.S. Kierland (2015)
The Lightning Tree by Erin Pringle-Toungate (2015)

Past contributors
Authors
 James Brown (Los Angeles Diaries)
 Andrew Coburn (Edgar Award nominee for the novel Goldlilocks)
 Michael C. Keith 
 Ned Vizzini (It's Kind of a Funny Story, Be More Chill, Teen Angst? Naaah...)
 Nancy Weber (The Life Swap)

Poets
 Cortney Davis
 Patricia Fargnoli
 S.A. Griffin
 Lyn Lifshin
 Tony O'Neill (Down and Out on Murder Mile, Digging the Vein)
 Charles Plymell
 Linda Ravenswood

Artists
 Chris Anthony
 Alessandro Bavari
 Jeremy Caniglia
 Ben Goossens
 Misha Gordin
 Michal Macku
 Mark Parisi (Off the Mark comic panel)

See also
 List of literary magazines

References

External links
 Tweets From Tahrir book review
 Nov 22, 2016 Underground Voices interview
 Poets&Writers listing
 Duotrope Digest
 Hampton Roads Writers
 Cover screenshot gallery
 B&W artists series gallery

Literary magazines published in the United States
Fiction magazines
American literature websites
Magazines established in 2004